"Worth It" is a song by American singer YK Osiris, released on February 8, 2019 by Universal Music Group and Def Jam Recordings. It was sent to urban contemporary radio & rhythmic contemporary radio on March 9, 2019. It served as the second single from his debut studio album, The Golden Child. "Worth It" became his first song to hit the Billboard Hot 100, debuting at 87 and peaking at 48.

The remix of the song, featuring fellow singers Tory Lanez and Ty Dolla $ign, also appeared on The Golden Child along with the original version.

Charts

Weekly charts

Year-end charts

Certifications

References 

2019 singles
2019 songs
Songs written by Taz Taylor (record producer)